Huntingburg is a city in Patoka Township, Dubois County, in the U.S. state of Indiana. The population was 6,362 at the 2020 census.

Located in southwestern Indiana, the city is known for its downtown with numerous antique shops. It is part of the Jasper Micropolitan Statistical Area. The city is also known as the "Hollywood of the Midwest." The movies A League of Their Own (1992), Hard Rain (1998), and the HBO film Soul of the Game (1996) were filmed in Huntingburg. Columbia Pictures renovated the grandstand at League Stadium that was to become part of the set for A League of Their Own.

History
Huntingburg was platted in 1837 by Colonel Jacob Geiger who purchased  of land and became one of the city's first permanent settlers. It was likely so named because the site had been a popular hunting ground. Huntingburg was incorporated as a town in 1866.

The Huntingburg Commercial Historic District and Huntingburg Town Hall and Fire Engine House are listed on the National Register of Historic Places.

The Huntingburg post office has been in operation since 1842.

As part of Dubois County, Huntingburg re-entered the Eastern Time Zone on November 4, 2007 after 15 months on the Central Time Zone.

On May 14th 2020 during the 2019-20 coronavirus pandemic, the city's local meat processing plant run by Farbest Foods reported 42 cases of COVID-19 among the employees, resulting in an 2-day closure beginning on May 18th.

Geography

Huntingburg is located at  (38.296853, -86.954344).

Climate

The climate in this area is characterized by hot, humid summers and generally cool winters.  According to the Köppen Climate Classification system, Huntingburg, IN has a humid subtropical climate, abbreviated "Cfa" on climate maps.

Demographics

2020 census 
As of the census of 2020, there were 6,362 people residing in the city. The racial makeup of the city was 79.4% White, 6.2% Black or African American, 0.7% American Indiana and Alaska Native, 2.5% Asian, and 2.3% from two or more races. Hispanic and Latino of any race were 28.6% of the population.

Regarding age, persons under 5 years were 7.1% of the population, persons under 18 years were 31.1%, and persons 65 years and over were 15.3%. The gender makeup of the city was 49.8% male and 50.2% female.

Persons in poverty were 15.2% of the population.

2010 census
As of the census of 2010, there were 6,057 people, 2,334 households, and 1,554 families residing in the city. The racial makeup of the city was 87.3% White, 0.5% African American, 0.2% Native American, 0.3% Asian, 9.9% from other races, and 1.8% from two or more races. Hispanic or Latino of any race were 18.5% of the population.

There were 2,334 households, of which 37.4% had children under the age of 18 living with them, 46.4% were married couples living together, 13.8% had a female householder with no husband present, 6.3% had a male householder with no wife present, and 33.4% were non-families. 28.5% of all households were made up of individuals, and 11.8% had someone living alone who was 65 years of age or older. The average household size was 2.55 and the average family size was 3.11.

The median age in the city was 35.1 years. 27.9% of residents were under the age of 18; 7.8% were between the ages of 18 and 24; 27.3% were from 25 to 44; 23.6% were from 45 to 64; and 13.5% were 65 years of age or older. The gender makeup of the city was 47.7% male and 52.3% female.

2000 census

As of the census of 2000, there were 5,598 people, 2,162 households, and 1,444 families residing in the city. The racial makeup of the city is mostly White, 92.2%, Hispanic 9.8%, African American 0.2% two races or more 0.8%.

There were 2,162 households, out of which 33.3% had children under the age of 18 living with them, 50.8% were married couples living together, 11.2% had a female householder with no husband present, and 33.2% were non-families. 28.5% of all households were made up of individuals, and 12.9% had someone living alone who was 65 years of age or older. The average household size was 2.51 and the average family size was 3.05.

In the city, the population was spread out, with 26.2% under the age of 18, 9.1% from 18 to 24, 28.3% from 25 to 44, 20.5% from 45 to 64, and 15.9% who were 65 years of age or older. The median age was 36 years. For every 100 females, there were 91.3 males. For every 100 females age 18 and over, there were 88.9 males.

The median income for a household in the city was $33,415, and the median income for a family was $41,925. Males had a median income of $29,756 versus $22,167 for females. The per capita income for the city was $15,882. About 6.8% of families and 10.8% of the population were below the poverty line, including 11.3% of those under age 18 and 9.9% of those age 65 or over.

Education

Southwest Dubois County School Corporation 
In 1972, the school system of Holland, a town west of Huntingburg along State Road 161, was consolidated into that of Huntingburg, resulting in the formation of Southwest Dubois County School Corporation, which includes the following schools:
 Southridge High School 
 Southridge Middle School 
 Huntingburg Elementary School
 Holland Elementary School 

The town has a free lending library, the Huntingburg Public Library.

Culture

League Stadium was home to the Dubois County Dragons who played in the Heartland League (1996–1998) and the Frontier League (1999–2002). From 1996 to 2001, Huntingburg was the smallest city to host a professional baseball team. After the Dragons franchise moved, Jeff Martindale League Stadium stood empty in the summers until the Bluff City Bombers of the Central Illinois Collegiate League moved to Huntingburg in 2005 and were renamed the Dubois County Bombers. The CICL then merged with the Prospect League.  As the Prospect League has a larger geographical footprint, the Bombers moved to the Ohio Valley League as of the 2013 season.

Transportation
Huntingburg Airport is a public use airport located three nautical miles (6 km) south of the central business district of Huntingburg. It is owned by the Dubois County Airport Authority.

The Dubois County Railroad connects to the Norfolk Southern mainline in Huntingburg.

Notable people
 Tim Barrett, Major and minor league baseball player
 Ray Blemker, Major and minor league baseball player; Georgia Tech baseball and basketball star, All-SEC
 Don Buse, ABA Champion (1973) and NBA player; NCAA Champion (1971)
 Bob Coleman, Major League Baseball player and minor league manager
 Alex Graman, Major League Baseball pitcher for New York Yankees; Japan League pitcher for Saitama Seibu Lions; Japan Series Champion (2008), Asia Series Champion (2008)
 Bill Menke, basketball player for 1940 national champion Indiana Hoosiers
 Benjamin F. Miessner, engineer and inventor
 W. Otto Miessner, composer and music teacher
 Gordon St. Angelo, former Indiana Democratic Party chairman
 Mitch Stetter, pitcher for Milwaukee Brewers for five years; coach in Kansas City Royals organization
Colson Montgomery, professional baseball shortstop in the Chicago White Sox organization
John L. Bretz, member of the U.S. House of Representatives from Indiana's 2nd district

See also
Uhl Pottery

References

External links
 City website

 
Communities of Southwestern Indiana
Cities in Indiana
Cities in Dubois County, Indiana
Jasper, Indiana micropolitan area
Populated places established in 1837
1837 establishments in Indiana